Robert Booth (20 December 1890 – after 1925) was an English professional footballer who made nearly 200 appearances in the Football League playing for Blackpool, Birmingham, Southend United, Swansea Town, Merthyr Town and New Brighton. He played as a wing half.

Booth was born in West Hartlepool, County Durham. He began his football career with Spennymoor United before joining Second Division club Blackpool in May 1912. In three seasons before the First World War and one season after, Booth played 96 Football League games before moving to Birmingham in May 1920. Described as a "very quiet hard worker who never becomes ruffled", he played six times in his first season, at the end of which the club were promoted. Booth played twice in the First Division, but was allowed to leave at the end of the season. He embarked on a tour of the Third Divisions, spending short spells with Southend United, Swansea Town, Merthyr Town and New Brighton.

References

1890 births
Year of death missing
People from West Hartlepool
Footballers from Hartlepool
English footballers
Association football midfielders
Spennymoor United F.C. players
Blackpool F.C. players
Birmingham City F.C. players
Southend United F.C. players
Swansea City A.F.C. players
Merthyr Town F.C. players
New Brighton A.F.C. players
English Football League players